The women's sprint competition of the Biathlon World Championships 2012 was held on March 3, 2012 at 15:30 local time.

Results 
The race started at 15:30.

References

Biathlon World Championships 2012
2012 in German women's sport